The Lee County Library System was founded in 1964 and is composed of 13 branches which serve Lee County, Florida. Olive Stout, who arrived in Fort Myers, Florida in 1886, started the town's first reading room and was pivotal in founding its first library. Around 1955, the city moved the library into a small one room building. The Lee County Library System's mission is to strengthen the community by informing and enriching individuals.

Branches

Services
The library system has over 1.5 million items available for patrons to use or check out, and circulates over 6 million items per year. The system also offers amenities such as meeting rooms, an online catalog and e-sources, as well as DVDs, CDs, and the streaming of movies and video. Each branch provides users with internet access, including wireless access points. The system also provides public access computers, and scan and print capabilities.

Library Cards

Adult
Library cards are issued free of charge to individuals 18 years or older who:
 Are residents of Lee County
 Are employed in Lee County
 Are property or business owners in Lee County
 Are students of Lee County
 Are residents of other Southwest Florida counties with libraries participating in the Reciprocal Borrowing program

Non-residents may obtain a Lee County Library card for a fee by showing photo identification. Library cards are valid for two years and renewal must be done in person with the same documents required for original card registration. Loss or theft of a card, as well as any account changes, must be reported to the library immediately.
In order to obtain a replacement card, patron must show photo identification and will be charged a $1 fee.

Child/Teen
Library cards with full privileges are free of charge for children and teens under age 18. Requirements include:
 Name ID, such as birth certificate, insurance card, school ID, official school schedule, report card or letter from school 
 Parent or legal guardian who accompanies the child or teen shows ID for proof of address and owes less than $10 on his/her own library account

The Lee County Library System provides a way to pre-register for a card online. A temporary card grants access to downloadable and streaming materials. A permanent card can be obtained by proving eligibility at any branch.

Reciprocal Borrowing Program
Residents from participating neighboring counties, may obtain a Lee County Library card free of charge through the Southwest Florida Library Network's Reciprocal Borrowing Program (SWFLN). Residents of participating counties must first visit their own community's library and ask for a SWFLN Reciprocal Borrowing sticker, in which they may then present to any Lee County Library location, along with photo identification. This must be done every calendar year.

Services

Bookmobile
The Lee County Library System has a mobile book service called the Bookmobile that travels throughout the county to bring materials to those who cannot physically make it to a library branch location, or those in housing projects and low income neighborhoods. Patrons of the bookmobile have about 4,000 items to choose from, including books, DVDs, and magazines in both English and Spanish.

Talking Books
The Lee County Library System is a subregional library of the Florida Bureau of Braille and Talking Books Library. Recorded books are shipped free of charge to patrons who fill out an application affirming their visual or physical disability that makes traditional reading difficult. In addition to recorded books, the Talking Books Library also provides Braille books and narrated magazines. The Lee County Talking Books Library has thousands of titles in its collection as well as access to 2.5 million titles through the Florida Bureau of Braille and Talking Books Library.

Books-by-Mail
Books-by-Mail is a service offered by the Lee County Library System, which supplies library materials to individuals who are unable to use the library due to temporary or long-term physical and medical disabilities. Books-by-Mail sends materials, including books, CD books, DVDs, Blu-ray and music CDs through the mail in zippered nylon bags to registered patrons. When the materials are due, the patron attaches postage and mails the bag back to Books-by-Mail or the bag can be dropped off at any branch of the Lee County Library System.

Online Library 
The Lee County Library System is partnered with Overdrive, Libby, and hoopla to provide popular digital content. These services allow free access to eBooks, Audiobooks, Magazines, Videos, and Music.

Southwest Florida Reading Fest (annual)
The Southwest Florida Festival is the second largest reading festival in Florida and draws thousands of fans to hear and meet best-selling authors, participate in creative contests and activities and find the latest and greatest in books and information technology.  It is a fun, informative and entertaining one-day event that celebrates books and the written word. The festival appeals to all ages, with adult and children's programs. The event is usually held in downtown Fort Myers, FL in March. The Lee County Library System produces the festival which began in 2000.

Fandom Fest (annual) 
Fandom Fest is a free, annual celebration of geek and pop culture that offers live music, contests, and cosplay. It is hosted by the Lee County Library System. It is located at the Fort Myers Regional Library located at 2450 First St. Fort Myers, FL 33901. This yearly festival includes live entertainment, a reading challenge, character meet and greets, an all ages costume contest, and lots of awesome prizes. The festival is divided into fandom themed areas, that have included Space, Sword and Sorcery, Superheroes and Villains, and Asian Culture. This event offers a mixture of activities, games, tech demos, and DIY makerspaces. There is a virtual reality hub that Festivalgoers can enjoy, as well as Kpop dance tutorials. The Fandom reading challenge allows participants to win prizes through virtual activities using the READsquared app platform. Participants of all ages can be eligible to win prizes and a special Grand Prize. The Character meet and greets allow participants to take pictures with their favorite characters. The costume contest has categories for birth-age 5, kids ages 6–11, teens ages 12–17, and adults ages 18 and up. The winner is chosen by crowdsourced voting and a judges panel. To ensure everyone’s safety and enjoyment of Fandom Fest, attendees must observe the Lee County Library System Patron Code of Conduct on festival day. In 2020, the Fandom Fest was held exclusively online and the one day Fandom Fest was converted into a month long virtual festival with different themed weeks, costumes, and prizes. It returned to in person in 2021.

Library Support
The library receives public support in a variety of ways, including Friends groups, volunteers, and donations.

Due to inflation and changes in public views towards government spending library budgets have needed to turn to Friends of the Library groups for fund raising from private sources.

According to the State of Florida's 2017-2018 statistics, Lee County Library System's Friends groups have a total of 1,270 members and they raised $152,589 for their library system and spent $80,829 on projects and programs.

References

Public libraries in Florida